Naive is the fourth studio album by American singer Andy Grammer, released through S-Curve Records on July 26, 2019. It includes the lead single, "Don't Give Up on Me".

Background
In an interview with People, Grammer provided information on the album and its tracks, including "She'd Say", which was described as "a touching song about what his mom would say to his daughter if she were still alive." "It's really sweet, it's one of my favorites," Grammer explained, adding that "the whole song is about little pieces of advice, like 'You're beautiful, but don't overplay that card' or 'You're spiritual, so don't forget that part.'"

Track listing

Charts

References

2019 albums
Andy Grammer albums
S-Curve Records albums
Albums produced by Jon Levine